The Great Passion (French: La grande passion) is a 1928 French silent drama film directed by André Hugon and starring Lil Dagover, Rolla Norman and Patricia Allen.

The film's sets were designed by the art director Christian-Jaque.

Cast
 Lil Dagover as Sonia de Blick 
 Rolla Norman as Jean d'Espoey 
 Patricia Allen as Mary Bush 
 Paul Menant as Rétifat 
 Léon Larive as Etchenoga 
 Var Dannes as Mr. Bush 
 Georges Astruc as Patrick 
 Adolphe Jauréguy as Capitaine de l'équipe de France de rugby

References

Bibliography 
 Dayna Oscherwitz & MaryEllen Higgins. The A to Z of French Cinema. Scarecrow Press, 2009.

External links 
 

1928 films
French silent feature films
1920s French-language films
Films directed by André Hugon
French black-and-white films
French drama films
1928 drama films
Silent drama films
1920s French films